Vincent Bracigliano (born 30 September 1958) is a French former professional footballer who played as a midfielder. He is the uncle of Gennaro Bracigliano.

Honours
Metz
 Coupe de France: 1983–84

References

Living people
1958 births
Association football midfielders
French footballers
Ligue 1 players
Ligue 2 players
FC Metz players
FC Nantes players
Nîmes Olympique players
Luçon FC players
French sportspeople of Italian descent
Sportspeople from Moselle (department)
Footballers from Grand Est